Marie Hartley   (29 September 1905 – 10 May 2006) was writer or co-writer and illustrator of some 40 books on the social history of the Yorkshire Dales.

Life
Hartley was born into a prosperous family of wool merchants at Morley, near Leeds. She attended Leeds College of Art and then the Slade School in London, where she specialised in wood engraving. On her return to Yorkshire she settled in the market town of Wetherby. During the 1930s and 1940s she set up in partnership with a local writer, Ella Pontefract, illustrating books on the Dales and Yorkshire. The two women published six books on Yorkshire life and customs before Pontefract died in 1945.
Subsequently, Marie Hartley was joined by Joan Ingilby. Marie Hartley spent 75 years gathering material which related to disappearing rural traditions of Yorkshire. The women travelled across the county collecting stories, written material and artefacts, all of which they brought back to the 17th-century cottage they shared at Askrigg in Wensleydale. In the early 1970s they donated their collection to the former  North Riding of Yorkshire County Council. In 1979 this gift formed the basis of the collection now housed in the Dales Countryside Museum at Hawes.

They wrote the "groundbreaking" Life and Traditions in the Yorkshire Dales (1968), and The Old Hand Knitters of the Dales (1951) which showed how important knitting is. These two are considered to be classics. The archive of their documents and photographs remains in the care of the Yorkshire Archaeological Society, whose Silver Medal they won in 1993. Both were appointed MBE in 1997, and in 1999 received honorary degrees from the Open University. Ingilby died in 2000 aged 89.

Works
Works by or about Marie Hartley with Ella Pontefract and Joan Ingilby

References 

1905 births
2006 deaths
English centenarians
People from Morley, West Yorkshire
Alumni of Leeds Arts University
Alumni of the Slade School of Fine Art
British travel writers
Members of the Order of the British Empire
Writers about Yorkshire
British women travel writers
Women centenarians